Ismael Alfredo Hernández Deras (born Victoria de Durango, February 20, 1964) is a Mexican politician affiliated with the Institutional Revolutionary Party (PRI) who served as Governor of the State of Durango from September 15, 2004 to September 14, 2010.
Hernández has previously served as municipal president (mayor) and senator.

He studied at the ESIMA (Escuela Secundaria Ignacio Manuel Altamirano) in the capital, Durango. He received an accounting degree from the Universidad Juárez del Estado de Durango, where he was a student leader. From 1989 until 1992, he was president of the Revolutionary Juvenile Front in Durango, and at the same time a local member of the Chamber of Deputies.

Between 1992 and 1995 he was an elected into the Chamber of Deputies for the state of Durango, and during the time between 1992 and 1994, he was state president of the PRI.

In 1994, he was elected Federal Deputy for Durango, ending in 1997. From 1995 until 1998 he was Secretary General of the "Confederación Nacional de Organizaciones Populares en Durango" and was elected  a state senator between 1997 and 2000.

He was elected mayor of Durango in 1998. In 2000 he was elected senator. In 2003 he was elected governor of the state of Durango. He ended his tenure when he became governor of the state on September 15, 2004 until 2010.

Ismael Hernandez Deras was elected senator in the recent elections of 2012.

References

External links
 Legislative profile

1964 births
Living people
Institutional Revolutionary Party politicians
Members of the Senate of the Republic (Mexico)
Members of the Chamber of Deputies (Mexico)
Members of the Congress of Durango
Municipal presidents in Durango
Governors of Durango
Politicians from Durango
20th-century Mexican politicians
21st-century Mexican politicians
Universidad Juárez del Estado de Durango alumni
Academic staff of Universidad Juárez del Estado de Durango
Senators of the LXII and LXIII Legislatures of Mexico